Jean van Silfhout (2 May 1899 – 29 January 1942) was a Belgian rower. He competed at the 1920 Summer Olympics in Antwerp with the men's coxed four, where they were eliminated in round one. At the 1924 Olympics, he competed in the eight event; in this regatta, the team was eliminated in the round one repêchage.

References

1899 births
1942 deaths
Belgian male rowers
Olympic rowers of Belgium
Rowers at the 1920 Summer Olympics
Rowers at the 1924 Summer Olympics
Royal Club Nautique de Gand rowers
European Rowing Championships medalists
20th-century Belgian people